American Nicaraguan Foundation is a not-for-profit organization founded in 1992 to aid impoverished areas of Nicaragua.  Projects include strengthening medical assistance, increasing educational attainment, building safe shelters, providing clean water solutions, promoting economic opportunity, and delivering humanitarian aid to impoverished communities all over Nicaragua.  The organization utilizes a network of other organizations to deliver aid.

References

External links 
 
 2008 Annual Report

Non-profit organizations based in Florida
1992 establishments in Florida
Organizations based in Miami
Nicaragua–United States relations
Organizations established in 1992